The Duan was a pre-state tribe of Xianbei ethnicity during the era of Sixteen Kingdoms in China.

History
The reason the tribe adopted the Han Chinese surname Duan is unknown.

Duan Wuwuchen was given in 303 a hereditary title— the "Duke of Liaoxi" —by the Jin dynasty.  Even after their tribe was defeated and absorbed by Former Yan, the Duan clan remained honored and powerful, and several Former Yan and Later Yan empresses, as well as important officials, were members of the Duan clan.

Chieftains of the Duan

Language

Shimunek classifies Duan as a "Serbi" (i.e., para-Mongolic) language. Shimunek's "Serbi" linguistic branch also includes Taghbach, Tuyuhun, and Khitan.

See also
Xianbei
List of past Chinese ethnic groups
Five Barbarians
Duan Qi

References

 
Sixteen Kingdoms
Xianbei
Ethnic groups in Chinese history
Tribes of Asia